Musa Ramadani (born 21 May 1944) is a Kosovan novelist and poet of Albanian extraction.

Born in Gjilan in what was then Yugoslavia, Ramadani worked as a journalist for Rilindja. In 1969 he decided to focus on writing literature and since then he has published many volumes of verse, stories and novels.  Ramadani is consideredone of the leading Albanian prose writers of Kosovo in the last three decades of the 20th century. 

In 2017 he was awarded the Kadare Prize for his novel The Prophet from Prague

Works

Novels
 Romani pa kornizë (1975)
 Zezona (1978)
 Ligatina (1983)
 Vrapuesja e Prizrenit (1995)
 Antiprocesioni (1997)
 Profeti nga Praga (2017)

Story collections
 Fluroma
 Satana ma vodhi gurin e urtisë
 Inamor: 55 (2000)

References

Sources

1944 births
Living people
Albanian novelists